Al-'Ain al-Sokhna ("the Hot Spring") is a town in the Suez Governorate, lying on the western shore of the Red Sea's Gulf of Suez.

History
Recent archaeological excavations have shown that there was an ancient Egyptian port and settlement in this area. The site was first brought to attention in 1999 by Professor Mahmud Abd El Raziq. French and Egyptian archaeologists have been investigating this area since that time. It can be compared with the port of Mersa Gawasis further south. It connected the mining areas of the Sinai with Memphis some 120 km across the Eastern Desert, important for turqouise and copper.

Early Bronze
As early as the Old Kingdom, seafaring expeditions on the Red Sea were organized from this port. Similar material was also found at the Wadi Maghareh, where many Old Kingdom inscriptions are found.

Middle Bronze
In the Middle Kingdom, activity continued along the Red Sea and across to the mining areas in the Sinai.

Eleventh Dynasty
In Year 1 of Mentuhotep IV, an expedition of 3,000 men was sent to bring back "products the desert"..

Twelfth Dynasty
Some 4,000 men were sent in an expedition during the reign of Amenemhat I. In Year 9 of Senusret I and Year 2 of Amenemhat II more expeditions were sent. Ity, son of Isis, was an official serving Amenemhat II and he also has two inscriptions at Wadi Maghara dated to the same year. Ten storage gallaries cut into the rock has yielded items, including wooden boat planks, ceramics from the 12th Dynasty, and a gold pendant with paralells to some found at Dahshur dating to the reign of Senusret III.

Climate
Köppen-Geiger climate classification system classifies its climate as hot desert (BWh), as the rest of Egypt.

Economy
The town also has a port called Ain Sokhna port.

References

Hot springs of Egypt
Resorts in Egypt
Archaeological sites in Egypt
1999 archaeological discoveries
Tourist attractions in Egypt